Grevillea huegelii, commonly known as comb spider-flower or comb grevillea, is a species of flowering plant in the family Proteaceae and is endemic to southern continental Australia. It is an erect to low-lying shrub with divided leaves with mostly three to eleven sharply-pointed linear lobes, and clusters of red to pink flowers that are silky-hairy on the outside.

Description

Taxonomy
Grevillea huegelii was first formally described in 1845 by Carl Meissner in Johann Georg Christian Lehmann's Plantae Preissianae from specimens collected near the Avon River, near York in 1839. The specific epithet (huegelii) honours Charles von Hügel.

Distribution and habitat
Comb spider-flower grows in a variety of habitats, including mallee woodland and heath and has a disjunct distribution in southern continental Australia. In Western Australia it is widespread from Moora to Borden and east to Cundeelee and Balladonia. It is also widespread in the southern half of South Australia, the north-west of Victoria and in western New South Wales.

References

huegelii
Proteales of Australia
Flora of New South Wales
Flora of South Australia
Flora of Victoria (Australia)
Eudicots of Western Australia
Taxa named by Carl Meissner
Plants described in 1845